Viktor Raychev (born 26 May 1986) is a Bulgarian retired footballer who played as a defender.

Career
On 4 December 2017, Raychev joined Third League side Minyor Pernik.

References

External links

1986 births
Living people
People from Pernik
Bulgarian footballers
Association football defenders
PFC Marek Dupnitsa players
PFC Minyor Pernik players
PFC CSKA Sofia players
FC Tsarsko Selo Sofia players
FC Lokomotiv 1929 Sofia players
First Professional Football League (Bulgaria) players
Second Professional Football League (Bulgaria) players